Roy Limbert (1893–1954) was a prominent London West End theatre director and producer between the 1930s and the 1950s.

Biography

The son of Charles Limbert and Florence Strahan Campbell, Roy Limbert was born in 1893 and educated at Bedford School.

In 1929, Limbert established the Malvern Festival, at the Festival Theatre, Malvern, with Sir Barry Jackson.  He was joint director of the festival with Jackson until 1938, when he assumed sole control.  Between 1929 and 1949, the Malvern Festival was primarily a festival of the work of George Bernard Shaw, producing twenty-two of his plays, six of them for the first time in England, one a world premiere.

Between 1932 and 1952, Limbert directed and produced a large number of highly successful London West End theatre productions.

Roy Limbert died on 29 November 1954.

London West End stage productions directed and produced by Roy Limbert

The School for Husbands, Royal Court Theatre, 1932
She Shall Have Music, Saville Theatre, 1934
Barnet’s Folly, Haymarket Theatre, 1935
The Last Trump, Duke of York's Theatre, 1938
Geneva, Saville Theatre, 1938, and St James's Theatre, 1939
Worth a Million, Saville Theatre, 1939
Music at Night, Westminster Theatre, 1939
In Good King Charles’s Golden Days, New Theatre, 1940
Rookery Nook, St Martin's Theatre, 1942
Mr Bolfry, Westminster Theatre, and subsequently Playhouse Theatre, 1943
It Depends What You Mean, Westminster Theatre, 1944
The Forrigan Reel, Sadler's Wells Theatre, 1945
Dr Angelus, Phœnix Theatre, 1946
School for Spinsters, Criterion Theatre, 1947
The Anatomist, Westminster Theatre, 1948
Miss Mabel, Duchess Theatre, subsequently Royal Strand Theatre, 1948
Two Dozen Red Roses, Lyric Theatre, 1949
Lady Audley’s Secret, Princes Theatre, 1949
Buoyant Billions, Princes Theatre, 1949
Black Chiffon, Westminster Theatre, 1949, 1950
Background, Westminster Theatre, 1950
Journey’s End, Westminster Theatre, 1950
Lace on Her Petticoat, Ambassadors Theatre, 1950
Beauty And The Beast, Westminster Theatre, 1950
The Martins’ Nest, Westminster Theatre, 1951
Taking Things Quietly, Ambassadors Theatre, 1951
Winter Sport, on tour, 1951
The Day’s Mischief, Duke of York's Theatre, 1951–52

References

1893 births
1954 deaths
People educated at Bedford School
English theatre directors
British theatre managers and producers
English theatre managers and producers
British theatre directors
20th-century English businesspeople